Tollner or Töllner is a German language occupational surname for a collector of tolls or customs levies. Notable people with the name include:
 Dave Tollner (1966), Australian politician
 Ted Tollner (1940), former American football player and coach

References 

German-language surnames
Occupational surnames